Kevin Savigar (born 9 November 1956) is an English session keyboardist, record producer, songwriter, and composer based in Los Angeles, CA.  Perhaps most recognised for his longtime collaboration with Rod Stewart, Savigar has also contributed to a wide range of recordings for artists such as Bob Dylan, George Harrison, John Mellencamp, Pat Benatar, Marilyn Manson, Willie Nelson, Randy Newman, Sinead O'Connor, and Peter Frampton among others.

Early life
Savigar was born in London, England in 1956. Savigar started to play the piano at age five days and went on to study classical piano at the prestigious Trinity College of Music. By the age of 17, Savigar had begun his career as a session musician in the studios of London.

Professional career

Rod Stewart

Savigar joined Rod Stewart's touring and recording band in 1978. Savigar worked in collaboration with Stewart, Phil Chen, Jim Cregan and Gary Grainger on Stewart's studio album Foolish Behaviour, which sold more than 5 million albums worldwide. Savigar co-produced six tracks on Stewart's 2013 studio album Time.

Rod Stewart discography

Additional works

Kevin has contributed to the following works listed below:

Awards

In total, Savigar has won 6 ASCAP awards, 16 RIAA awards, 10 Brit Awards aka BPI awards, 2 SOCAN awards and a Nashville Songwriters Association International No. 1 award.

 1980 Brit Awards for Foolish Behaviour by Rod Stewart
 1980 RIAA award for Foolish Behaviour by Rod Stewart
 1981 Brit Awards for Tonight I'm Yours by Rod Stewart
 1982 RIAA award for Tonight I'm Yours by Rod Stewart
 1983 Brit Awards for Body Wishes by Rod Stewart
 1984 Brit Awards for Camouflage by Rod Stewart
 1984 RIAA award for Camouflage by Rod Stewart
 1986 Brit Awards for Every Beat of My Heart by Rod Stewart
 1988 RIAA award for Out of Order by Rod Stewart
 1988 Brit Awards for Out of Order by Rod Stewart
 1990 ASCAP Pop award for writer Forever Young
 1990 RIAA award for Storyteller – The Complete Anthology: 1964–1990 by Rod Stewart
 1990 RIAA award for Downtown Train by Rod Stewart
 1990 ASCAP Pop award for publisher Forever Young
 1990 SOCAN award for writer Forever Young
 1990 SOCAN Pop award for publisher Forever Young
 1991 RIAA award for Vagabond Heart by Rod Stewart
 1991 Brit Awards for Vagabond Heart by Rod Stewart
 1992 RIAA award for '’Patty Smyth'’ by Patty Smyth
 1993 RIAA award for Unplugged...and Seated by Rod Stewart
 1995 RIAA award for A Spanner in the Works by Rod Stewart
 1995 Brit Awards for The Best of Rod Stewart by Rod Stewart
 1996 RIAA award for If We Fall in Love Tonight by Rod Stewart
 1996 Brit Awards for If We Fall in Love Tonight by Rod Stewart
 1996 ASCAP Pop award for writer "Hold On" by Jamie Walters
 1996 ASCAP Pop award for publisher "Hold On" by Jamie Walters
 2001 Nashville Songwriters Association International award for Nothin' To Lose by Josh Gracin
 2003 RIAA award for co-writer The Cheetah Girls by the Cheetah Girls
 2004 RIAA award for The Story So Far: The Very Best of Rod Stewart by Rod Stewart
 2005 ASCAP Country music award for writer Nothin' To Lose by Josh Gracin
 2005 ASCAP Country Music award for publisher Nothin' To Lose by Josh Gracin
 2012 RIAA award for Merry Christmas, Baby by Rod Stewart

References

1956 births
Living people
English songwriters
English record producers
Rod Stewart
English rock keyboardists
English expatriates in the United States
Musicians from London